Slam Bolt Scrappers is a puzzle video game produced by independent developer Fire Hose Games. Players control characters who fight enemies in a beat'em up style and build towers to destroy other players. The game blends aspects of several video game genres including puzzle, action, and strategy. Slam Bolt Scrappers was released on March 15, 2011 for digital download on PlayStation Network.

Reception 

The PC version received "favorable" reviews, while the PlayStation 3 version received "average" reviews, according to the review aggregation website Metacritic.

References

External links 

2011 video games
Gamebryo games
PlayStation 3 games
PlayStation Network games
Puzzle video games
Video games developed in the United States
Windows games